Adalvard is the name of two clergymen who were active in Sweden during its Christianization in the 11th century.

Adalvard the Elder (died c. 1064), bishop of Skara
Adalvard the Younger (died b. 1072), his successor in Skara

Viking Age clergy
Masculine given names